Cubing may refer to:

 Puzzle games
 Trying to solve a Rubik's Cube
 Nickname for speedcubing, solving various combinations puzzles as quickly as possible
 Cubing the cube, a mathematical problem
 "The Cubing", an episode of the animated TV series Aqua Teen Hunger Force